Swampscott is a town in Essex County, Massachusetts, United States, located  up the coast from Boston in an area known as the North Shore. The population was 15,111 as of the 2020 United States Census. A former summer resort on Massachusetts Bay, Swampscott is today a fairly affluent residential community and includes the village of Beach Bluff, as well as part of the neighborhood of Clifton.

History 

The area in and around Swampscott, Massachusetts has been inhabited by indigenous people for 12,000 years. Prior to European colonization, the town was inhabited by members of the Naumkeag, Pennacook, and Pawtucket groups and Massachusett tribe. They spoke an Eastern Algonquin language, and the Pawtucket migrated seasonally throughout the eastern coasts of Massachusetts and Rhode Island. It's estimated that 50-100 indigenous individuals resided in the Swampscott area at the time of European colonization. A series of epidemics following European settlement, including smallpox, killed many of the indigenous people living in the area, and it's estimated that fewer than 50 individuals remained by the late 17th century.

Wood's New England Prospect lists "Swampscott" as a noted habitation in 1633 before extensive European settlement. According to an early twentieth century source, the name "Swampscott" is variously said to mean "at the red rock", "broken waters", or "pleasant water place".

Indigenous people in the Swampscott area subsisted on seasonally determined activities, including hunting, fishing, collecting wild plants and shellfish, and horticulture. They hunted deer, marine mammals, upland game birds, and ducks, and cultivated crops like corn, beans, pumpkin, squash, and tobacco.

Swampscott was first colonized by Europeans in 1629 when Francis Ingalls settled there and built the first Massachusetts Bay Colony tannery. Ingalls observed that the town's indigenous population lived in wigwams extending from Black Will's Cliff along the entire north shore. The town was first settled as the eastern part (Ward One) of Lynn, and was set off and officially incorporated in 1852.

In 1857, a piece of the far western end of Salem, then known as the "Salem Finger", became part of Swampscott. While Revere Beach, which lies just several miles down the road, has the honor of technically being America's first public beach, Swampscott was the de facto first resort town. Lynn was the divider between the poor beach and the rich resort town.

Education

Swampscott's public school system includes three elementary schools: Hadley School, Clarke School, and Stanley School (demolished as of 2022) ; one middle school, Swampscott Middle School; and one high school, Swampscott High School. The Machon elementary school was shut down in 2008–2009, but the property remains on the district's rolls. A new building was completed in 2007 for Swampscott High School. In 2011, Swampscott considered installing a wind turbine, with the approximate height of a 30-story building, on the property of the Swampscott Middle School but ultimately rejected the project. In a special election on October 19, 2021, voters approved a new $98 million elementary school to be built on the site of the Stanley School. This new school will replace all three former schools and is set to be opened to students in September 2024.

Geography and transportation
Swampscott is located at  (42.474409, −70.905883). According to the United States Census Bureau, the town has a total area of 6.7 square miles (17.4 km2), of which 3.0 square miles (7.9 km2) is land and 3.7 square miles (9.6 km2), or 54.83%, is water. Located beside Massachusetts Bay and the Atlantic Ocean, Swampscott lies along a mostly rocky shoreline, though there is enough clear shore for five beaches; Phillips which stretches into Preston and is by far the largest beach in town, Eisman's and Whales, Fisherman's, and a part of King's Beach, which extends into Lynn. There are several small parks, along with the small Harold King Forest in the northwest corner of town and the Tedesco Country Club which bisects part of the town. The town also has two small ponds, Foster Pond and Palmer Pond.

Swampscott is mostly suburban, with most of the clear land in the northwest corner of town. There are three villages within town, Beach Bluff to the east, Phillips Point to the south, and Phillips Beach inland between the two. Swampscott is bordered by Marblehead to the northeast, Salem to the northwest, and Lynn to the southwest. The water rights of the town extend into Massachusetts Bay, bordered by those of Marblehead and Lynn.

Demographics

 As of the census of 2020, there were 15,111 people, with 6,093 households and 2.45 persons per household, residing in the town. The population density was 5,000.3 inhabitants per square mile (12,950.7/km²). The racial makeup of the town was 91.5% White, 1.2% Black or African American, 0.2% American Indian or Alaska Native, 2.6% Asian, 0.0% Pacific Islander, and 3.7% from two or more races. Hispanic or Latino of any race were 5.6% of the population.

There were a total of 6,093 households, out of which 30% had children under the age of 18 living with the. 57% of households were married couples living together, 26.6% were a female householder with no spouse, and 10.3% were a male householder with no spouse. Of all households, 18.2% were made up of individuals, and 10.9% were individuals over the age of 65 living alone.

In town, the population was spread out, with 5.4% under 5 years, 20.5% under 18, 55.5% between the ages of 18 and 64, and 18.6% 65 years and over. The median age of residents was 45 years. For every 100 females age 18 and over, there were 87.2 males.

The median household income was $114,086, and the median income for a family was $143,320. Married-couple families had a median income of $156,341 and non-family households had a median income of $60,880. The per capita income for the town was $63,585. The town is ranked 54th on the List of Massachusetts locations by per capita income. About 5% of Swampscott residents were below the poverty line, including 4% of those under 18 years, 4.2% of those 18-64, and 9.1% 65 years and older. The homeownership rate was 73.4%, and the median value of owner-occupied housing units was $560,500. 

The median home sale price for the town in 2007 was $565,894. Home values typically range from around $400,000 to upwards of $5 million for ocean front homes. These prices are comparable to other wealthy North Shore towns such as Marblehead and Manchester-by-the-Sea which are located nearby. In upper class oceanfront neighborhoods and neighborhoods with ocean views or views of the Boston skyline, average home prices increase to as much as $1,038,569 and average household incomes can range upwards of $150,000. Larger oceanfront properties have recently been assessed at values greater than $5 million and in some cases upwards of $10 million.

Historic buildings and sites 

 Elihu Thomson House: 1889 built home, now serves as Swampscott Town Hall
 John Humphreys House: 1700s house, one of the oldest in town, now home to Swampscott Historical Society
 Mary Baker Eddy Historic House: house where Mary Baker Eddy lived in the 1860s, one of considered birthplaces of Christian Science.
 Swampscott Fish House: 1896 built structure, the oldest active fish house in the country.
 General Glover Farm: 1700s built house and farm, home to Revolutionary war hero General John Glover.
 Swampscott Railway Depot: 1868 built railroad depot for the Eastern Railroad.
 Olmsted Subdivision Historic District, located on Monument Avenue

Swampscott was home to White Court, Calvin Coolidge's Summer White House, and later Marian Court College until the college's closure in 2015, and demolition in 2018-2019.

Transportation

The MBTA provides passenger rail service from Boston's North Station with the Swampscott station on its Newburyport/Rockport Line, as well as several bus lines. An abandoned 4-mile branch of the Boston & Maine Railroad originating in Swampscott serves as the Marblehead Rail Trail.

Swampscott is located along Massachusetts Route 1A and Route 129. Both routes enter from Lynn, with Route 1A passing north of the town center towards Salem, and Route 129 following the coast for a half mile before going inland north of Phillips Point and returning to the coast before heading into Marblehead. There is no highway within town, which lies well south of Massachusetts Route 128 and Interstate 95. The town is served by numerous MBTA bus routes which lead into the surrounding towns.

The nearest air service can be reached at Beverly Municipal Airport, and the nearest national and international air service can be found at Boston's Logan International Airport.

Notable people
 Bill Adams, retired NFL player
 Harold Alfond, founder of Dexter Shoe
 Osborne Anderson, ice hockey player who competed in the 1932 Winter Olympics
 Anthony Athanas, restaurateur and philanthropist
 Charlie Baker, C.E.O. of Harvard Pilgrim Health Care, Inc., Governor of Massachusetts 
 Charles Henry Bond, president and general manager of Waitt & Bond, one of Boston's largest real estate holders, and a patron of the arts
Carol Brady, fictional TV mom
Walter Brennan, multiple Academy Award-winning actor
 Freddy Cannon, rock singer who had hits with "Way Down Yonder in New Orleans" and "Palisades Park"
 Peggy Stuart Coolidge, composer and conductor
 Kyle Cooper, film director, title designer
 Mabel Wheeler Daniels, composer, conductor, and teacher
 Jamie Denbo, actress and comedian
 Mary Baker Eddy, founder of the Christian Science religion
 Larry Eigner, poet
 Jefferson Friedman, composer
 General John Glover, Revolutionary war veteran and hero in who helped row Washington's troops across Delaware and at Battle of Long Island
 Mel Goldstein, chief meteorologist for WTNH television in New Haven, Connecticut
 Nan Goldin, artist, photographer, activist
 Barry Goralnick, founder of Barry Goralnick Architects; theatrical producer of Eve-olution, Scituate, The Irish Curse, Saint Heaven
 Barry Goudreau, original guitarist of the rock group Boston and the Lisa Guyer Band
 Sarah P. Harkness, architect
 Jim Hegan, professional baseball catcher and coach
 Mary-Louise Hooper, civil rights activist
 Dick Jauron, professional football player and head coach of the NFL's Chicago Bears, Detroit Lions, and Buffalo Bills
 Harvey Jewell, Speaker of the Massachusetts House of Representatives from 1868 to 1871
 Theodora J. Kalikow, American academic and university president
 Jackson Katz, anti-domestic violence advocate
 Piper Kerman, author of Orange Is the New Black: My Year in a Women's Prison
 Ken Linseman, former professional hockey player (Boston Bruins and Philadelphia Flyers)
 Todd McShay, ESPN NFL draft prospect analyst
 Gerhard Neumann, German-born aviation engineer and innovator; former vice president of General Electric
 Chris Paine, documentary director
 Michael Palmer, author of The First Patient
 Barry Pederson, former NHL and Bruins all star; current NESN hockey analyst
 Johnny Pesky, pro baseball coach, former Red Sox shortstop
 Antonio Pierro, recognized as the oldest living man in the U.S. (January 9 to February 8, 2007) and the world's oldest living World War I veteran (January 24 to February 8, 2007)
 David Portnoy, founder of Barstool Sports
 David Lee Roth, lead singer of the rock group Van Halen
 Blondy Ryan, Major League Baseball shortstop
 George P. Sanger, lawyer, editor, judge, and businessman
 Mark Shasha, artist, author of Night of the Moonjellies
 Fran Sheehan, original bass player of the rock group Boston
 Jim Smith, State Representative, MA House of Representatives.
 Lesley Stahl, 60 Minutes correspondent
 Thomas Stephens, Retired player for the NFL's Patriots
 G. Joseph Tauro, Chief Justice of the Massachusetts Supreme Judicial Court from 1970 to 1976
 Elihu Thomson, founder of General Electric
 Ilario Zannino, member of the Patriarca crime family

See also
 
 Northern Strand Community Trail

References

External links

 Town of Swampscott official website
 Swampscott Historical Commission
 Swampscott Public Library
 Clifton Improvement Association
 Marian Court College
 Landscape Photos of Swampscott's shore
 Photographs of landmarks and historic places in Swampscott, MA

 
1629 establishments in Massachusetts
Populated coastal places in Massachusetts
Populated places established in 1629